Păulești is a commune in Vrancea County, Romania, with a population of 2,257. It is composed of two villages, Hăulișca (population: 770) and Păulești (population: 1487). These were part of Tulnici Commune until 2003, when they were split off.

Natives
 Leopoldina Bălănuță

References

External links 
 Lege pentru înfiinţarea comunei Păuleşti, prin reorganizarea comunei Tulnici, judeţul Vrancea

Communes in Vrancea County
Localities in Western Moldavia